Yamanadanda is a village in Sindhupalchok District in the Bagmati Zone of central Nepal. At the time of the 1991 Nepal census it had a population of 1664 and had 303 houses in it.

References

Populated places in Sindhupalchowk District